Bridlington was a constituency in East Yorkshire, represented in the House of Commons of the Parliament of the United Kingdom from 1950 until it was abolished for the 1997 general election. It was named after the town of Bridlington.

It returned one Member of Parliament (MP), elected by the first-past-the-post voting system.

History
The constituency was created in 1950 from the former seat of Buckrose. It was abolished in 1997 and most of its territory transferred to the East Yorkshire seat.

Boundaries
1950–1955: The Municipal Boroughs of Bridlington and Hedon, the Urban Districts of Driffield, Filey, Hornsea, and Withernsea, and the Rural Districts of Bridlington, Driffield, and Holderness.

1955–1983: The Municipal Boroughs of Bridlington and Hedon, the Urban Districts of Filey, Hornsea, and Withernsea, and the Rural Districts of Bridlington and Holderness. The two Driffield districts were transferred to the new Howden constituency.

1983–1997: The Borough of East Yorkshire wards of Bridlington Bessingby, Bridlington Hilderthorpe, Bridlington Old Town East, Bridlington Old Town West, Bridlington Quay North, Bridlington Quay South, Coastal, Driffield North, Driffield South, Hutton Cranswick, Lowland, Nafferton, Roman, St John, and Viking, and the Borough of Holderness.  Driffield transferred back from Howden.

Members of Parliament

Elections

Elections in the 1950s

Elections in the 1960s

Elections in the 1970s

Elections in the 1980s

Election in the 1990s

See also
List of parliamentary constituencies in Humberside

Notes and references

Parliamentary constituencies in Yorkshire and the Humber (historic)
Constituencies of the Parliament of the United Kingdom established in 1950
Constituencies of the Parliament of the United Kingdom disestablished in 1997
Bridlington